Central Connecticut State University (Central Connecticut, CCSU, Central Connecticut State, or informally Central) is a public university in New Britain, Connecticut. Founded in 1849 as the State Normal School, CCSU is Connecticut's oldest publicly-funded university. It is made up of four schools: the Ammon College of Liberal Arts and Social Sciences; the School of Business; the School of Education and Professional Studies; and the School of Engineering, Science, and Technology. As of Spring 2022, the university was attended by 8,898 students: 7,054 undergraduate students and 1,844 graduate students. More than half of students live off campus and 96 percent are Connecticut residents. The school is part of the Connecticut State Colleges & Universities system (CSCU), which also oversees Eastern, Western, and Southern Connecticut State Universities.

History

Central Connecticut State University was founded in 1849 as the State Normal School to train teachers. It was the sixth normal school in the United States and is the oldest public university in Connecticut. It ran until 1867 when the school was temporarily closed due to opposition in the Connecticut General Assembly. Two years later, the Normal School resumed its services and continued to do so until the 1930s. In 1933, the Connecticut General Assembly created the Teachers College of Connecticut and the first bachelor's degrees were granted. In 1922, the campus moved to its current location on Stanley Street. 

The school was again renamed in 1959, becoming the Central Connecticut State College.

In 1983, the school transitioned from a college to a regional university and thus became Central Connecticut State University. Organizational governance changed in 2011 when the Connecticut Department of Higher Education was dissolved and replaced by the Office of Higher Education and the Connecticut Board of Regents for Higher Education.

Academics
The most popular Bachelor's programs by student enrollment are Business and Marketing, Social Sciences and Psychology, Education, Engineering, Communications, English, and Biology. Bachelor's programs are also offered in a variety of other fields such as computer information systems, literature, and the visual and performing arts. The school has a student-faculty ratio of 17:1, with 43 percent of its classes enrolling fewer than 20 students. In 2012, the 6-year graduation rate for first-time students increased to 52%.

U.S. News & World Report for 2022 ranked the university tied #105 in Regional Universities North.

There are over 400 full-time faculty, 83% of whom possess the terminal degree in their field. Another 501 part-time instructors also teach at the university.

Graduate programs are in all of the academic schools. These include programs in accountancy, education, literature, international studies, engineering technology, and information technology. A number of doctoral degrees are also offered.

Academic and office halls

 Copernicus Hall (nursing, biology, engineering)
 Vance Academic Center (business, communications, criminology, social work, and graphic design)
 Bassett Hall (anthropology, geography, history, political science, sociology)
 Sanford Hall (computer science, economics)
 Barnard Hall (education, graduate studies)
 Welte Hall (music)
 Maloney Hall (theatre, art) 
 Kaiser Hall (fitness science, gym & pool)
 Marcus White Hall (mathematics, philosophy, psychology)
 Willard-DiLoreto Hall (English, journalism, philosophy, world languages)
 Catherine J. Fellows Dance Education Center (Dance, Dance Education)

Facilities
Facilities include 10 academic halls, the Student Center, the Burritt Library, and numerous laboratories. Computer labs are available throughout campus, the largest of which is located in Marcus White Hall. Dining facilities are located in Memorial Hall Hilltop Dining Center and the Student Center. Additional computers and laboratories are spread across all of the academic halls. Welte Hall, Maloney Hall, and the Student Center function as large gathering areas for events, music performances, and theater productions. Welte contains the main auditorium and Kaiser Hall houses the main gymnasium, and houses an Olympic-size pool. Fitness classes are freely available to students in Memorial Hall and fitness equipment is provided in four locations across campus through RECentral.

Administrative offices, including Admissions, the Registrar, and Financial Aid are located in Davidson Hall. New building projects have expanded liberal arts classroom space and made significant upgrades to all sports facilities.

Residence halls and commuters
Residence halls can accommodate up to 2,500 students in nine residence halls in two quads, which are split between the north and south ends of campus.

Recent projects
A new eight-story residence hall (Mid Campus Residence Hall) opened for occupancy in the Fall of 2015. The $82 million dorm features "suite" style rooms, in addition to a 2,000 square foot fitness facility, a kitchen on each floor, and a server kitchen and main lounge with a fireplace on the main floor. The Office of Residence Life is located on the first floor of the new facility.

During the past several years, the new $37-million Social Sciences Hall, 4,300-square-foot Bichum Engineering Laboratory, and 12,500-square-foot Campus Police Station opened. In 2011, the first floor of the Elihu Burritt Library was renovated to create a new common area with seating, couches, computers, and food vendors. Arute Field and its adjacent practice and baseball fields also underwent extensive construction and renovation from 2010 through the present, including new football, soccer, track, and practice field turf. New football, track, and soccer stadium seating were added, as well as construction on the Balf–Savin baseball field.

Athletics

The university's athletic teams are known as the Blue Devils. Their mascot was originally named Victor E, but was changed to Kizer in 2011 after unveiling a new logo. Central Connecticut State participates in NCAA at the Division I (Football Championship Subdivision football) level as a member of the Northeast Conference. The university fields 18 varsity sports, eight men's sports: baseball, basketball, cross country, football, golf, soccer, as well as indoor and outdoor track & field; and ten women's sports: basketball, cross country, golf, lacrosse, soccer, softball, swimming, indoor and outdoor track & field, and volleyball.

Notable alumni

Athletes and coaches
 Steve Addazio – college football coach
 Al Bagnoli – college football coach
 Ricky Bottalico – professional baseball player and sports journalist
 Dave Campo – professional football coach
 Joe Costello – professional football player
 Ryan Costello – professional baseball player
 Jake Dolegala – professional football player
 Justise Hairston – professional football player
 John Hirschbeck – Major League Baseball umpire
 Skip Jutze – professional baseball player
 Scott Pioli – NFL Executive;  3× PFWA Executive of the Year (2003, 2007, 2010)
 Rich Ranglin – professional football player
 Evan Scribner – professional baseball player
 Mike Sherman – college and professional football coach
 John Skladany – college football coach
 Bob Zuffelato – professional basketball coach

Entertainers
 William Berloni – animal behaviorist known for training of animals for stage, film, and television
 Erin Brady – Miss Connecticut USA 2013, Miss USA 2013
 Richard Grieco – actor, 21 Jump Street, Booker
 Kenny Johnson – actor, The Shield, Sons of Anarchy
 Jimmy "Jomboy" O'Brien – sports media personality and podcaster
 Colleen Ward – Miss Connecticut 2015, contestant in 2015 Miss America pageant

Public servants
 Ebenezer D. Bassett – first U.S. African-American ambassador (to Haiti), appointed by President Ulysses S. Grant in 1869
 Miguel Cardona – Education Commissioner of Connecticut (2019-2021); United States Secretary of Education (2021-present)
 Walter Eli Clark – last Governor of the District of Alaska and first Governor of the Alaska Territory, appointed by President William Howard Taft on May 18, 1909
 Carmen E. Espinosa – Justice of Connecticut Supreme Court, 2013–2021
 Bruce Hyer – Member of Canadian Parliament (2008–2015)
 Michael J. Ingelido – WWII fighter pilot, Distinguished Service Cross recipient, Air Force Major General (1960s)
 John Larson – Congressman (D-CT) (1999–present); former Connecticut Senate President
 Frances P. Mainella – 16th Director (2001–2006) of National Park Service
 Francis M. Mullen – head of U.S. Drug Enforcement Administration (1981–1985)
 Maria L. Sanford – educator (1870), has statue in Capitol's National Statuary Hall Collection for the state of Minnesota; namesake of Liberty ship, launched in 1943, SS Maria Sanford
 Erin Stewart – Mayor of New Britain (2013–present), youngest-serving female mayor in U.S.

Other
 Justice Ofei Akrofi – Archbishop, Church of the Province of West Africa
 Frederic Beecher Perkins – editor, librarian and writer
 C.J. Stevens - Author of over 30 books
 Theodore Stowell – president of Bryant University, 1878–1916
 Eliza Talcott – missionary to Japan and founder of Kobe College

Guest speakers and honorees

Commencement speakers

CCSU's commencement speakers are often successful alumni such as Congressman John B. Larson (D-1st), CitiFinancial CEO Michael Knapp, and CCSU professor Kristine Larsen. The most recent four governors of Connecticut have spoken at CCSU commencement exercises.

Robert C. Vance Distinguished Lecture Series

Since 1983, 23 speakers have been featured as part of the Vance Distinguished Lecture Series. These have included well-known journalists such as Anderson Cooper, Dan Rather, and Bob Woodward, as well as figures from government such as Robert Gates, Rudolph Giuliani, and Shimon Peres.

Recipients of CCSU honorary degrees

CCSU began awarding honorary doctoral degrees in 1985. Honorees have included the CEOs or Chairmen of six major corporations, four U.S. Presidents, and heads of state of Canada, Germany, Hungary, and Poland.

See also
Charter Oak State College is located across the street from Central Connecticut State University.
The University of Connecticut is the largest public university in the state.

Footnotes

References
Herbert E. Fowler, A Century of Teacher Education in Connecticut, New Britain CT: Teachers College of Connecticut, 1949.

External links

 
 Blue Devils Athletics

 
Public universities and colleges in Connecticut
Educational institutions established in 1849
Buildings and structures in New Britain, Connecticut
Copernican
Universities and colleges in Hartford County, Connecticut
1849 establishments in Connecticut